The Photo Ark is a National Geographic project, led by photographer Joel Sartore, with the goal of photographing all species living in zoos and wildlife sanctuaries around the globe in order to inspire action to save wildlife.

The project has been documented in a series of books and in a three-part documentary first shown on PBS and then released to home video. A selection of photographs from the project has been exhibited in various museums, zoos, and exhibition halls around the world. The documentary, RARE: Creatures of The Photo Ark, was awarded the Best Conservation Film award in 2018. The Photo Ark was featured on American television program 60 Minutes, with the episode first airing on October 14, 2018.

Goals 
The Photo Ark project, led by Joel Sartore in association with National Geographic, has the goal of inspiring action through education, and to help save wildlife by supporting conservation efforts. 

It is a multiyear effort which originally intended to document 12,000 species living in zoos and wildlife sanctuaries. In November 2021, the 12,000th species was photographed by Sartore who was 59 at the time, and the new goal was announced as being 15,000 species, which Sartore anticipated would take him another 10 to 15 years.

According to a February 2017 press release by National Geographic, one half of Earth's animal species could go extinct by 2100. Since starting the project, Sartore says several species he photographed are now extinct.

Origins
Sartore gained a love of nature while growing up in Nebraska. He was amazed by the idea of species going extinct, and thought that he would never see such occur in his lifetime. However, now he believes that in the 11 years he has worked on the Photo Ark project, he has seen 10 go extinct. In a March 2018 interview, Sartore said that he went to the Omaha zoo regularly as a child, getting to know the various animals. He says that his parents "made sure he was out in nature and appreciated it", which he says made all the difference.

In a February 2018 interview, Sartore said that he began the Ark project about 12 years ago when he was caring for his three young children while his wife was being treated for cancer, leading Sartore to consider his own future. "That's how the Ark got started, and I've been going at it ever since."

In an April 2018 interview, Sartore said he had been a National Geographic photographer for over 27 years, and although he worked for 15 years doing various conservation stories, the impact was not enough to "stop the extinction crisis". So he realized that maybe "very simple portraits lit exquisitely so you can see the beauty and the color, looking animals directly in the eye with no distractions, would be the way to do it."

Progress 
National Geographic reported on the project's status during significant milestones:
 The first animal to be photographed for the project was the naked mole-rat living at the Lincoln Children's Zoo.
 In September 2017, the 7,000th animal photographed for the project was announced: the Leadbeater's possum, a critically endangered marsupial which is native to the acacia forests of central Victoria in Australia.
 In May 2018, the 8,000th animal was announced: the semiaquatic Pyrenean desman.
 In December 2018, the 9,000th animal was announced: the Bandula barb, a colorful but critically endangered fish found in one stream in Sri Lanka.
 In May 2020 the 10,000th animal was announced: the güiña, which is the smallest wildcat in the Americas. National Geographic reported that "This pivotal milestone means that Sartore is about two-thirds of the way toward completing the National Geographic Photo Ark."
 In February 2021, the 11,000th animal was announced: the long-toothed dart moth (Dichagyris longidens), saying the photo may be the first one to capture a living representative of the species.
 In November 2021, the 12,000th animal was announced: the Arabian cobra, which until 2009 was classified as a subspecies of the Egyptian cobra.
 In July 2022, the 13,000th animal was announced: the spoon-billed sandpiper (Calidris pygmaea), which is listed as critically endangered by the International Union for Conservation of Nature.

The Photo Ark and related books 
The project has been documented in a series of books:
 Rare: Portraits of America's Endangered Species. 2010. . Precursor to The Photo Ark project.
 Animal Ark: Celebrating our Wild World in Poetry and Pictures. National Geographic Kids, 2017. .
 The Photo Ark: One Man's Quest to Document the World's Animals. 2017. .
 Birds Of The Photo Ark. 2018. .
 The Photo Ark Vanishing: The World's Most Vulnerable Animals. 2019. .

Rare: Creatures of The Photo Ark
Beginning in July 2017, PBS broadcast a three-part film, Rare: Creatures of The Photo Ark, which documented highlights of the project. Rare was later released for purchase in both Blu-ray and DVD format, and was also made available on Amazon Prime. As of February 2018, a second season was being discussed with National Geographic.

In a February 2018 interview, Rare director Chun-Wei Yi said that he met Sartore at National Geographic Television & Film, in 2006 or 2007, soon after he started the Photo Ark. In the course of making the series, Sartore photographed his 5,000th species.

Episodes

Documentary scheduled for 2020
In February 2019, it was announced that National Geographic and WGBH-Boston had joined forces to produce a "two-hour event special" about The Photo Ark, which would air on October 17, 2020.

Exhibitions 

To spread awareness of this project, a selection of photographs from The Photo Ark has been exhibited in various museums, zoos, and exhibition halls around the world, including the following locations:

Auditorium Parco della Musica, Rome, Italy, 2017
Cincinnati Zoo and Botanical Garden, Cincinnati, Ohio, 2017
Dallas Zoo, Dallas, Texas, 2017
Henry Doorly Zoo and Aquarium, Omaha, Nebraska, 2017
Hickory Museum of Art, Hickory, North Carolina, 2017
Melbourne Zoo, Melbourne, Australia, 2017 
National Museum of Wildlife Art, Jackson, Wyoming, 2017
San Diego Natural History Museum, San Diego, California, 2017 
National Stadium, Warsaw, Warsaw, Poland, 2017 
The War Memorial of Korea Museum, Seoul, South Korea, 2017
Los Angeles Zoo and Botanical Gardens, Los Angeles, California, 2018 
Ned Smith Center for Nature and Art Amphitheater, Millersburg, Pennsylvania, 2018
Museon, The Hague, Netherlands, 2018 
Museum of Natural History, Porto, Portugal, 2018 
Woodland Park Zoo, Seattle, Washington, 2018
Annenberg Space for Photography, Los Angeles, California, 2018

Awards
In February 2018, RARE: Creatures of The Photo Ark was awarded Best Conservation Film at the New York WILD Film Festival, held at The Explorers Club in Manhattan.

Reaction
Mike Norton, executive vice president of Norton Outdoor Advertising wrote in Billboard Insider that "In this era of division and hyper-partisanship, Photo Ark is a uniting cause. Photo Ark has earned support and respect across the political spectrum, from Harrison Ford to hunters."

In March 2017, Publishers Weekly reviewed The Photo Ark, commenting that the photos use black-and-white backgrounds to highlight the animals, and snapshots of the photographing process are included as well. The article says that "Sartore more than succeeds in his goal to provide people with an opportunity to become aware of these animals, many endangered, before they disappear."

In July 2017, The National Press Photographers Association reported that Sartore's goal is to photograph animals before they go extinct, but surmises that he may run out of time for many species. "It has taken 10 years so far to photograph about 6,500 of the estimated 12,000 species he wants to record. Sartore estimates it will take him 15 more years to finish... The first batch appears in 'The Photo Ark,' and its assortment of creatures is fascinating... [The book] will change the way you think of turning a field or forest into the next mall or housing development." In reality, the 12,000th species was added to the Ark in November 2021, and a new goal of photographing 15,000 species was set.

See also 
 Racing Extinction

References

External links 

 
 
 
 
 

National Geographic Society
Wildlife Conservation Society
Nature photography
Photographic collections and books